Sandy Neck Light is a lighthouse on Sandy Neck, in West Barnstable, Massachusetts, at the entrance to Barnstable Harbor. It was first established in 1826.  The current tower was built in 1857 and strengthened in the 1880s.  It was discontinued in 1931, replaced by a skeleton tower, which was discontinued in 1952.  The light was relit as a private aid to navigation in 2007.

References

Lighthouses completed in 1826
Lighthouses completed in 1857
Buildings and structures in Barnstable, Massachusetts
Lighthouses in Barnstable County, Massachusetts
1826 establishments in Massachusetts